Durham is a town in Middlesex County, Connecticut,  United States. Durham is a former farming village on the Coginchaug River in central Connecticut.  The population was 7,152 at the 2020 census. Every autumn, the town hosts the Durham Fair, the largest volunteer agricultural fair in New England.

The Durham town center is listed by the U.S. Census Bureau as a census-designated place. The core of the town center has also been listed as a historic district on the National Register of Historic Places.

Geography

The west side of Durham is flanked by the Metacomet Ridge, a mountainous trap rock ridgeline that stretches from Long Island Sound to nearly the Vermont border. Notable features of the Metacomet ridge in Durham include Trimountain, Fowler Mountain, Pistapaug Mountain, and the north tip of Totoket Mountain. The 50-mile (80-kilometer) Mattabesett Trail traverses the ridge. Miller's Pond State Park is located within the town.

History

Durham was incorporated in 1708. The settlement was named after Durham, England. It took land from Guilford, and Haddam.  Durham has one of the first public libraries in the United States. It was founded in 1733, two years after Benjamin Franklin started the Philadelphia library. Moses Austin who, along with his son Stephen F. Austin, began the settlement of Spanish and Mexican Texas by Anglo-Americans, was born in Durham in 1761. In the 1830s Durham came to prominence as the birthplace of Richard P. Robinson, who was tried for and acquitted of the infamous murder of Helen Jewett.

Demographics

As of the census of 2000, there were 6,627 people, 2,277 households, and 1,871 families living in the town. The racial makeup of the town was 96.68% White, 1.15% Black or African American, 0.18% Native American, 0.85% Asian, 0.30% from other races, and 0.85% from two or more races. Hispanic or Latino people of any race were 1.54% of the population.

There were 2,277 households, out of which 41.2% had children under the age of 18 living with them, 72.3% were married couples living together, 7.1% had a female householder with no husband present, and 17.8% were non-families. 14.5% of all households were made up of individuals, and 5.9% had someone living alone who was 65 years of age or older.  The average household size was 2.85 and the average family size was 3.17.

In the town, the population was spread out, with 29.0% under the age of 18, 4.8% from 18 to 24, 29.3% from 25 to 44, 27.4% from 45 to 64, and 9.5% who were 65 years of age or older.  The median age was 38 years. For every 100 females, there were 100.4 males.  For every 100 females age 18 and over, there were 94.4 males.

The median income for a household in the town was $77,639, and the median income for a family was $82,864. Males had a median income of $51,250 versus $38,833 for females. The per capita income for the town was $29,306.  About 1.3% of families and 1.7% of the population were below the poverty line, including 0.4% of those under age 18 and 3.1% of those age 65 or over.

Town center
As of the census of 2000, there were 2,773 people, 1,040 households, and 809 families living in the Durham census-designated place, corresponding to the town center. The population density was 443.1 inhabitants per square mile (171.0/km2). The racial makeup of the CDP was 97.91% White, 0.47% Black or African American, 0.07% Native American, 0.87% Asian, 0.25% from other races, and 0.43% from two or more races. Hispanic or Latino people of any race were 1.01% of the population.

There were 1,040 households, out of which 36.7% had children under the age of 18 living with them, 66.5% were married couples living together, 8.1% had a female householder with no husband present, and 22.2% were non-families. 18.9% of all households were made up of individuals, and 9.9% had someone living alone who was 65 years of age or older.  The average household size was 2.66 and the average family size was 3.06.

In the CDP the population was spread out, with 26.1% under the age of 18, 4.4% from 18 to 24, 28.9% from 25 to 44, 27.5% from 45 to 64, and 13.0% who were 65 years of age or older.  The median age was 40 years. For every 100 females, there were 96.2 males.  For every 100 females age 18 and over, there were 91.4 males.

The median income for a household in the CDP was $66,505, and the median income for a family was $72,465. Males had a median income of $47,179 versus $37,500 for females. The per capita income for the CDP was $26,972.  About 2.1% of families and 3.0% of the population were below the poverty line, including 1.0% of those under age 18 and 4.3% of those age 65 or over.

Government

Durham has a selectman-town meeting form of government. The current first selectman is Laura Francis, a Republican, who has served in this role since 2007. The other two selectmen are Republican John Szewczyk Jr, and independent George Eames.

State politics

Durham is split between the 12th and 34th state senate districts, as well as the 86th and 101st state house districts. Democrat Christine Cohen represents the 12th senate district, and Republican Paul Cicarella represents the 34th senate district. Vincent Candelora, the state House Minority Leader, represents the 87th state house district, and Democrat John-Michael Parker represents the 101st district. The 12th senate district, from 2015 to 2019, was represented by Edward M. Kennedy Jr. of the Kennedy family.

Durham has voted consistently voted Republican in gubernatorial elections. In the 2018 election, Republican Bob Stefanowski beat Democrat Ned Lamont 57%–37%.

Federal politics

Durham is part of Connecticut's 3rd congressional district, and is represented by Rosa DeLauro, however parts of it were located in the 2nd district as late as 2010.

Presidential elections

Historic locations in Durham

Elias Austin House
Thomas Lyman House
Main Street Historic District (the town center), noted for the architecture of the houses

Durham Meadows superfund site

The Durham Meadows superfund site encompasses an area of town around the abandoned Merriam Manufacturing, and the operational Durham Manufacturing company.  Both companies disposed of organic solvents, paint wastes, and degreasers in open lagoons and buried drums.  The waste leached into the town's water supply, contaminating several private wells with methylene chloride, 1,4-dioxane, and other volatile organic compounds (VOCs).

The U.S. Environmental Protection Agency and Connecticut Department of Environmental Protection are coordinating cleanup and monitoring efforts, including the delivery of free bottled water to affected residents.

Notable people

 Moses Austin (1761–1821), born in Durham; businessman involved in the lead industry
 Stephen F. Austin, founder of Texas; son of Moses Austin
 Vin Baker (born 1971), professional basketball player in the National Basketball Association
 Dwight Baldwin (1798–1886), Missionary to Hawaii
 Chauncey Goodrich (1759–1815), lawyer and politician
 Elizur Goodrich (1761–1849), lawyer and politician
 Vernon "Lefty" Gomez, New York Yankee Hall of Fame; 6 and 0 in World Series play
 Phineas Lyman (1716–1774), major general in the Connecticut militia during the French and Indian War
 Charles D. Madsen, Wisconsin State Senator
 James C. Scott (born 1936), political scientist and anthropologist
 James Wadsworth (1730–1816), lawyer; delegate to the Continental Congress in 1784

References

External links

 Durham town government website

 
Towns in Middlesex County, Connecticut
Towns in Connecticut
Greater Hartford